Sara Gedsted Thrige Andersen (born 15 May 1996) is a Danish professional footballer who plays as a midfielder for Italian Serie A club AC Milan and the Denmark national team.

Career
Andersen has been capped for the Denmark national team, appearing for the team during the UEFA Euro 2021 qualifying cycle.

International goals

Personal life 
Sara Thrige has a twin sister Sofie Thrige, who as of November 2021 plays for B.93 in the second best tier of Danish women's football.

References

External links
 
 
 

1996 births
Living people
Danish women's footballers
Denmark women's international footballers
Women's association football midfielders
Fortuna Hjørring players
Serie A (women's football) players
A.C. Milan Women players
Expatriate women's footballers in Italy
Danish expatriate sportspeople in Italy
Danish twins
Twin sportspeople
UEFA Women's Euro 2022 players